The 2004 United States Senate election in South Dakota was held on November 2, 2004. Incumbent Democratic U.S. Senator and Senate Minority Leader Tom Daschle ran for re-election to a fourth term, but was narrowly defeated by Republican John Thune.

Daschle was the only incumbent U.S. Senator to lose re-election in the 2004 election cycle. His defeat also marked the first time a Senate party leader lost a bid for reelection since 1952, when Barry Goldwater defeated Ernest McFarland in Arizona.

General election

Candidates 
 Tom Daschle, incumbent U.S. Senator and Senate Minority Leader (Democratic)
 John Thune, former U.S. Representative and nominee for U.S. Senate in 2002 (Republican)

Campaign 
In the 2004 congressional elections, Daschle lost his seat to Republican challenger and former U.S. Representative John Thune in a bitterly contested battle. Thune prevailed by a narrow margin of 4,508 votes (50.6–49.4%). Senate Majority Leader Bill Frist visited South Dakota to campaign for Thune, breaking an unwritten tradition that one party's leader in the Senate would not campaign directly for the other's defeat. Daschle's loss resulted in the first ousting of a majority or minority leader since 1952 when Arizona Senator Ernest McFarland lost his seat to Barry Goldwater. Daschle was the only incumbent Senator from either party to lose reelection in 2004. 

Throughout the campaign, Thune, along with Frist, President George W. Bush, and Vice President Dick Cheney, frequently accused Daschle of being the "chief obstructionist" of Bush's agenda and charged him with using filibusters to block confirmation of several of Bush's nominees to the federal judiciary. Thune also used moral values such as issues surrounding same-sex marriage and abortion to convince South Dakota voters that Daschle's positions on such topics were out-of-sync with the state's residents. The Republican candidate also drove home his strong support for the President while blasting Daschle for his vehement opposition to Bush. He attempted to sway voters by remembering that Bush won South Dakota in a landslide in 2000 and had a very high job-approval rating among South Dakotans. His opponent, the Minority Leader, repeatedly argued that he was funneling money into South Dakota for vital federal highway and water pet projects.

Daschle responded to Thune's claim that he was a partisan anti-Bush obstructionist by pointing to his action just nine days after the September 11 attacks when he hugged President Bush on the Senate floor following Bush's address to Congress and the nation. He also hit back by alleging that Thune wanted to "rubber stamp what the administration is doing." Daschle's use of the video of his embrace of Bush forced the Republican National Committee to demand that the ad be pulled, claiming that it suggests that Bush endorses Daschle. Shortly following the airing of the ad, in a nationally televised debate on NBC's Meet the Press, Thune accused Daschle of "emboldening the enemy" in his skepticism of the Iraq War.

Daschle also noticeably relied very heavily on the power of incumbency to win a fourth term. Some also argued that Stephanie Herseth's election to the state's only House seat hurt Daschle, as voters may not have been comfortable sending an all-Democratic delegation to Congress for the first time in many decades. Accusations that Daschle was possibly considering no longer being an official resident of South Dakota were believed to have offended voters there. Others have analyzed that Daschle's lengthy consideration and eventual rejection of a potential run for the presidency in 2004 took a toll on South Dakotans, who felt betrayed and used by Daschle as a result.

When the race began in early 2004, Daschle led by seven points in January and February. By May, his lead minimized to just two points and into the summer polls showed a varying number of trends: either Daschle held a slim one to two-point lead, Thune held a slim one to two-point lead, or the race was tied. Throughout September, Daschle led Thune by margins of two to five percent. During the entire month of October into the November 2 election, most polls showed that Thune and Daschle were dead even, usually tied 49-49 among likely voters. Some polls showed either Thune or Daschle leading by extremely slim margins.

Thune is a onetime aide to Senator James Abdnor, the man Daschle defeated in 1986 to gain his seat in the Senate.

During Daschle's farewell address on November 19, 2004, he received a standing ovation from the Senate floor. His term as South Dakota's senator expired on January 3, 2005, with the commencement of the 109th Congress. Harry Reid took over as Minority Leader, and became Majority Leader in 2007.

Predictions

Polling

Results

See also 
 2004 United States Senate elections

References 

South Dakota
2004
2004 South Dakota elections